The 4th 10 Hours of Messina was a sports car race, held on 25 July 1955 in the street circuit of Messina, Italy.

Final standings

 Started:	23
 Classified:	6

See also
 Messina Grand Prix (auto race that replaced it)

References

External links
 La 10 Ore di Messina, la storia 

10 Hours of Messina